Polaria polaris is a species of sea slug, an aeolid nudibranch, a marine heterobranch mollusc in the family Paracoryphellidae.

Distribution
This species was described from the Arctic Ocean.

Description
Polaria polaris is a flabellinid nudibranch with numerous closely spaced cerata and extremely long rhinophores. The body is translucent white and the digestive gland in the cerata is red. There is a broad band of opaque white pigment at the tip of the cerata. The rhinophores are smooth or slightly wrinkled and the oral tentacles have a splash of white pigment in the outer third.

References

Paracoryphellidae
Gastropods described in 1946